David Vadim was born in Ukraine and raised in Brooklyn, New York. He grew up competing  in sanctioned no-rules fighting and eventually transitioned to boxing. He has written about his experiences in the ring in a series of short stories. His story Boredom was adapted to the stage, which led to David developing a deep interest in theatre, performing Off-Broadway and soon getting discovered for his portrayal of the poet Arthur Rimbaud.

Biography
David's screen career began with the role of Sasha in James Gray's 1994 film Little Odessa, starring Tim Roth, Edward Furlong, Maximilian Schell, and Vanessa Redgrave. Since then David has worked with such internationally acclaimed directors as Ridley Scott, Wolfgang Petersen, Ron Howard, and Martin Scorsese, co-starring in box office hits Air Force One, G.I. Jane, Ransom, as well as Holy Rollers, Brooklyn Babylon, Side Streets, Punisher: War Zone, The Briefcase, Little New York and Path To 911, among others. Also David's portrayal of the corrupt Detective Montini in Steven Seagal's Exit Wounds brought him wide international recognition. Because of his expanding career, he was offered Ukrainian Celebrity Bachelor, but respectfully turned it down.

In addition to guest starring on Law and Order, Third Watch, Street Time, Law & Order: Trial by Jury, Fringe,  Blue Bloods, The Blacklist, Person Of Interest, and Daredevil, David had a recurring role in Denis Leary's Rescue Me—playing the lovable Paulie, a mentally disabled young man "adopted" by the fire house crew. More recently David portrayed General Nikolai Timoshev in Gavin O'Connor's pilot episode of The Americans, FX's cold war hit. In 2014 David landed the role of SVR Resident Gennady Isakov in George Nolfi's spy drama Allegiance on NBC, co-starring Hope Davis, Scott Cohen and Breaking Bad's Giancarlo Esposito. David recurred on Madam Secretary as the Ukrainian Foreign Minister Luka Melnik and worked on Martin Scorsese's Vinyl for HBO, playing Hilly Crystal, the creator of the iconic NYC club CBGB. His most recent work is on the TV series Roeng, playing  the Russian Astronaut, Sergei—from the creators of Netflix's Lilyhammer. Most recently, David can be seen as Buck Peirson in Dee Rees upcoming film The Last Thing He Wanted, starring Anne Hathaway. As well as one of the stars of Caviar, a film based on the memoir career criminal Mike Markovich. He's next guest starring on Blindspot, playing Constantine, a corrupt business man.

From coaching award winning actors on Broadway, film and television, to having consulted the famed LaGuardia School of Performing Arts on his acting technique, David is dedicated to helping his clients reach their specific needs in managing and developing their careers.

Filmography

Little Odessa (1994) - Sasha
The Pallbearer (1996) - An Abernathy Cousin
Ransom (1996) - Cop #5
Air Force One (1997) - Igor Nevsky
G.I. Jane (1997) - Cortez
A Small Taste of Heaven (1997, Short)
New York Undercover (1998, TV Series) - Sage Ryan
Side Streets (1998) - Josif Iscovescu
Dating Games (1998) - Mark
Third Watch (2000, TV Series) - Jack
Looking for an Echo (2000) - Tommie Pirelli
Brooklyn Babylon (2001) - Judah
Exit Wounds (2001) - Matt Montini
Law & Order (2001-2005, TV Series) - Johnny Zona / Robert Kelly
I Am Woody (2003, Short)
Street Time (2003, TV Series) - Burt Kent
Hack (2003, TV Series) - Manny
X, Y (2004) - Dispatcher
Love Rome (2004) - David Vadim (uncredited)
Law & Order: Trial by Jury (2005, TV Series) - Detective Saunders
Rescue Me (2005, TV Series) - Paulie
5up 2down (2006) - Amir
The Path to 9/11 (2006, TV Mini-Series) - Kevin Shea
Rockaway (2007) - Yuri
New Amsterdam (2008, TV Series) - Carney
Fringe (2008, TV Series) - Michael Kelly
Punisher: War Zone (2008) - Cristu Bulat
Little New York (2009) - Tall Man
One Life to Live (2009, TV Series) - Sergei
Holy Rollers (2010) - Mr. Maxim
Law & Order: Criminal Intent (2010, TV Series) - Valeyev
The Briefcase (2011) - Khakis

External links

http://davidvadim.com

1972 births
American male film actors
Ukrainian male film actors
Ukrainian male boxers
Living people